Thomas George Woodward (13 November 1900 – 1981) was a Welsh footballer who played in the Football League for Chesterfield, Merthyr Town, Preston North End and Swansea Town.

References

1900 births
1979 deaths
Welsh footballers
Association football forwards
English Football League players
Merthyr Town F.C. players
Chesterfield F.C. players
Bridgend Town A.F.C. players
Llanelli Town A.F.C. players
Preston North End F.C. players
Swansea City A.F.C. players
Taunton Town F.C. players
Troedyrhiw F.C. players